Uccle-Stalle railway station is a railway station in the municipality of Uccle in Brussels, Belgium. The station is operated by the National Railway Company of Belgium and located on line 124 between the stations of Forest-East and Uccle-Calevoet. The station is named after the neighbourhood Stalle in Uccle.

Trains calling at this station are local trains running from Nivelles to Brussels-North, Nivelles to Antwerp-Central.

Train services
The station is served hourly by the following service(s):

Brussels RER services (S1) Antwerp - Mechelen - Brussels - Waterloo - Nivelles (weekdays)
Brussels RER services (S1) Brussels - Waterloo - Nivelles (weekends)

References

External links
 

Railway stations in Brussels
Uccle
Railway stations opened in 1873